The 2008–09 Second and Third Division Knock-Out (known as quick Keno Second and Third Division Knock-Out for sponsorship reasons) was a knockout tournament for Maltese football clubs playing in the Second and Third Division. The winners were Melita which successfully defended this title from their win in the previous season.

Group stage

Group 1

Group 2

Group 3

Group 4

Group 5

Group 6

Group 7

Group 8

Knockout phase

See also 
 2008–09 Maltese Second Division
 2008–09 Maltese Third Division

Maltese Second and Third Division Knock-Out
knock-out